Hezb-e Islami Khalis is an Afghan political ex-Mujahidin movement under Maulawi Khalis, who separated from Gulbuddin Hekmatyar's Hezb-e Islami and formed his own resistance group in 1979. The two parties were distinguished as Hezb-e Islami Gulbuddin and Hezb-e Islami Khalis, after the names of their respective leaders.

The Khalis party was part of the "Peshawar Seven", who fought against the Soviet presence in Afghanistan and later the Iraqi presence in Kuwait. Among its most famous commanders were Abdul Haq, Amin Wardak, Jalaluddin Haqqani, and founder of the Taliban, Mullah Omar.

Following Khalis' death in 2006, a power struggle ensued between his son Anwar ul Haq Mujahid and Haji Din Mohammad, the former governor of Kabul Province. Mohammad appears to have been successful in consolidating his control over much of the party.

References

Hezb-i Islami Khalis politicians
Anti-Soviet factions in the Soviet–Afghan War
Political parties in Afghanistan
Political parties established in 1979